Gəray (also, Gərəy, Gerey, and Girey) is a village and municipality in the Quba Rayon of Azerbaijan.  It has a population of 128.

References 

Populated places in Quba District (Azerbaijan)